Mesoplanodes babyrussus is a species of beetle in the family Cerambycidae, and the only species in the genus Mesoplanodes. It was described by Yamasako and Ohbayashi in 2011.

References

Mesosini
Beetles described in 2011